The National Health is the fourth studio album by English indie rock band Maxïmo Park. It was released in the United Kingdom on 11 June 2012 by V2 Records. The album was the first by the band to feature a title track. The one-minute opening track, a ballad with piano and strings, has been noted by the band as a deliberate move to disorientate the listener (previous albums have all begun with a fast-paced track, like the title track, "The National Health").

Singles
The first single released from the album was "Hips And Lips" in June 2012. The song joined BBC Radio 1's 'C' list, but only reached No. 171 in the UK Singles Chart. 

"The Undercurrents" was the second single released from the album in August 2012.

Reception
It received mainly positive reviews. The Guardian gave it 4 stars out of 5 calling it "energised and good fun".

NME rated it 8 out of 10, saying "The National Health', you see, is a fully ticked-off shopping list of everything that's unashamedly ace about this band, and it's all been bought from Waitrose – a change from the Tesco Value offerings of 2007's 'Our Earthly Pleasures’ and 2009's 'Quicken The Heart'. Maxïmo Park take themselves so seriously, and every song strives for heads-down greatness. 'The Undercurrents’ is the one moment they achieve it, transcending everything around it (including Smith's slightly clunky "I won't forget the way you forgive me" hook). It builds, storm-like, into something that might protrude proudly from a catalogue of the Bunnymen, of The Verve, of latter-day Manics, of any Great British Band aware that they are indeed a Great British Band. Maxïmo Park obviously aren't, but for these brief moments the possibilities are there. It's the peak."

Track listing
All lyrics by Paul Smith, all music by Duncan Lloyd, except where noted.

 "When I Was Wild" (Lukas Wooller) – 1:02
 "The National Health" (Lloyd, Wooller) – 3:00
 "Hips And Lips" (Wooller) – 3:32
 "The Undercurrents" – 4:01
 "Write This Down" (Archis Tiku, Lloyd, Wooller) – 3:14
 "Reluctant Love" – 3:17
 "Until The Earth Would Open" – 3:17
 "Banlieue" – 2:51
 "This Is What Becomes Of The Brokenhearted" (Wooller) – 3:54
 "Wolf Among Men" – 2:55
 "Take Me Home" (Smith, Lloyd) – 2:54
 "Unfamiliar Places" (Smith) – 3:49
 "Waves Of Fear" – 2:41

– Limited Deluxe Edition  with additional 4-Track-Bonus-EP:

 The Undercurrents (Acoustic Version)
 Hips And Lips (Acoustic Version)
 Reluctant Love (Acoustic Version)
 Until The Earth Would Open (Acoustic Version)

Personnel
Maxïmo Park
Tom English – drums
Duncan Lloyd – electric guitar, backing vocals
Paul Smith – lead vocals
Archis Tiku – bass guitar
Lukas Wooller – keyboards

Additional musicians
Beth Porter – cello on "When I Was Wild"

Technical staff
Amir Amor – additional recording and production
Dan Austin – engineering, mixing
Ben Humphreys – assistant
Peter Maher – mastering
Gil Norton – producer

Charts

References

2012 albums
Albums produced by Gil Norton
Maxïmo Park albums
V2 Records albums
Albums recorded at Rockfield Studios